My Love: Six Stories of True Love is a 2021 docuseries released on Netflix on April 13, 2021, starring David Isham, Ginger Isham and Michael Isham.

Cast 
 David Isham
 Ginger Isham
 Michael Isham
 Dee Riete as Nicinha
 William Skiff
 Asit Vyas as Satyabhama
 Mita Vyas as Satrva

Episodes

References

External links
 
 

2021 American television series debuts
2021 American television series endings
2020s American documentary television series
English-language Netflix original programming
Netflix original documentary television series
Television series about couples